Fridolin Hamma (17 September 1881 – 9 October 1969) was an influential German luthier from Stuttgart who authored two seminal reference books on violins:

He was the father of Walter Hamma (1916–1988), also a German luthier.

References 

German luthiers
People from Stuttgart
1881 births
1969 deaths